The 2019–20 curling season began in June 2019 and was scheduled to end in May 2020. However, the coronavirus pandemic declared in March 2020 resulted in the cancellation of events and the premature ending of the season.

Note: In events with two genders, the men's tournament winners will be listed before the women's tournament winners.

World Curling Federation events

Source:

Championships

Qualification events

Curling Canada events

Source:

Championships

Other events

Provincial and territorial playdowns

National championships

Denmark

Japan

Russia

Scotland

South Korea

Sweden

Switzerland

United States

World Curling Tour

Teams
See: List of teams on the 2019–20 World Curling Tour

Grand Slam events in bold.
Note: More events may be posted as time progresses.

Men's events

Source:

Women's events

Source:

Mixed doubles events

Source:

WCT rankings

Money list

References

2019-20
2019-20
Seasons in curling